Unoloukik is a Bangladeshi anthology streaming television series written by Shibabrata Barman and directed by Robiul Alam Robi. Individual episodes explore the psychoanalytic journey of the human mind. There are five episodes in this series. The first episode Moribar Holo Taar Shwaad premiered on 12 July 2021, and the last episode of the series Dwikhondito premiered on 12 August 2021 on Chorki.

The series has adopted four stories by Shibabrata Barman - Moribar Holo Tar Shwaad, Dwikhondito, Jagar Bela Holo (adapted to Mrs. Prohelika), and Television (adapted to Hello Ladies). And he wrote the fifth story Don't Write Me especially for this series.

Unoloukik has been produced under the banner of Film Noir and Film Syndicate. Saleh Sobhan Auneem served as the producer and Mir Mukarram Hossain, Tanim Noor, Rumel Chowdhury were the executive producers.

The screenwriting team consists of Neamoth Ullah Masum, Syed Ahmed Shawki, and Naseef Amin along with Shibabrata Barman and Robiul Alam Robi.

Five cinematographers worked on the five episodes of Unoloukik, which is a rare feat in the Bangladeshi entertainment industry. They are - Kamrul Hasan Khosru, Tanveer Ahmed Shovon, Sumon Sarker, Ishtiaque Hossain, and Barkat Hossain Polash.

The cast includes Asaduzzaman Noor, Gazi Rakayet, Chanchal Chowdhury, Nusrat Imrose Tisha, Rafiath Rashid Mithila, Iresh Zaker,  Intekhab Dinar, Mostafa Monwar, Sumon Anwar, Naziba Basher,  Shohel Mondol, Farhana Hamid, Sahana Rahman Sumi.

Premise

Genre and themes 
As Unoloukik is an anthology series, each episode is standalone and can be watched in any order. The program is an instance of Psychological fiction within thriller and drama. The majority of the episodes revolve around the maze of illusion and truth. Each of the stories has its dark materials present time and space paradoxes and questions pertaining to existence. There are historical testaments, psychological bewilderments, and an overall curious expedition of what might have been true if only a combination was altered.

Cast

Episode 1
 Gazi Rakayet as Psychiatrist
 Mostafa Monwar as Kabir
 Naziba Basher as Nawshin
 Sumon Anowar as Chef

Episode 2
 Asaduzzaman Noor as Farhad Mahmood 
 Shohel Mondol as Amir Hossain
 Farhana Hamid as Rokeya

Episode 3
 Nusrat Imrose Tisha as Humaira
 Chanchal Chowdhury as Psychologist

Episode 4
 Rafiath Rashid Mithila as Sicily
 Iresh Zaker as Ashraf
 Sahana Rahman Sumi

Episode 5
 Intekhab Dinar as Mostaq Ahmed

Episodes

Release
On 26 June 2021, Chorki released the poster of Unoloukik on social media. And on 10 July 2021, they released the trailer on YouTube. Unoloukik premiered on 12 July 2021, with an episode release. One episode would be released every week for the remainder of the 5-episode first season. The last episode Dwikhondito aired on 12 August 2021.

References

External links
 Unoloukik on Chorki
 

Chorki original programming
Bengali-language web series
Bangladeshi web series
2021 web series debuts
2021 Bangladeshi television series debuts
2020s Bangladeshi drama television series